The 1968 Individual Ice Speedway World Championship was the third edition of the World Championship.

The winner was Gabdrakhman Kadyrov of the Soviet Union for the second time.

Final 
  Salavat, February 20–21
  Ufa, February 24–25

References

Ice speedway competitions
Ice